Silvestro Belli (born December 29, 1781, in Anagni, Lazio, and died September 9, 1844, in lesi) was an Italian Roman Catholic priest, bishop and cardinal.

Biography 
He was one of the cardinals of the Catholic Church and associated with the Roman Curia, Pope Gregory XVI elevated him to the rank of cardinal in the consistory of December 14, 1840, in pectore and later became bishop of Iesi from 1842.

He died on September 9, 1844, at the age of 62.

References 

1781 births
1844 deaths
Italian bishops